Nubhetepti-khered was an ancient Egyptian king's daughter of the Thirteenth Dynasty. She is basically only known from her undisturbed burial at Dahshur which was discovered in 1894 by Jacques de Morgan, close to the pyramid of Amenemhat III.

Her burial was found at the end of a long corridor. It consisted of two chambers, one above the other. The lower chamber contained the coffin and the canopic chest of the princess. In the upper chamber were placed several burial goods.

The body of Nubhetepti-khered was placed in a wooden coffin, decorated with inscribed gold leaf. In the coffin were found the remains of an inner, mummyform, gilded coffin. The body of Nubhetepti-khered was adorned with a broad collar and with armlets and anklets. Next to the body were found several royal insignia, such as a flail and a was scepter. The wooden canopic chest was also adorned with gold leaf and contained four canopic jars made of alabaster.

In the chamber above the burial chamber were found several pottery vessels. There was a box with ointment jars and a second, long box with further royal insignia. Nubhetepti-khered is so far not yet known outside her burial. She was most likely related to king Hor, who was buried next to her. Otherwise, Miroslav Verner believes that she was a daughter of Amenemhat III of the previous Twelfth Dynasty, who was the original owner of the whole funerary complex.

Since the khered part of the name means child, it is possible that her mother was called Nubhetepti, and indeed there is a Great Royal Wife from this period, who is called Nubhetepti on a few scarabs.

Gallery

Literature

19th-century BC Egyptian women
1894 archaeological discoveries
Princesses of the Thirteenth Dynasty of Egypt
Children of Amenemhat III